National Road 1.10 (alternatively marked as M-1.10, M1.10 and M 1.10), was a road in Serbia, connecting Ralja with Smederevo. After the new road categorization regulation given in 2013, the route wears the name 14, except for the section Radinac – Smederevo 1, which is currently not numbered. The route was a national road with two traffic lanes.

Sections

See also 
 Roads in Serbia

References

External links 
 Official website – Roads of Serbia (Putevi Srbije)
 Official website – Corridors of Serbia (Koridori Srbije) (Serbian)

Roads in Serbia